This is a list of all tornadoes that were confirmed by local offices of the National Weather Service in the United States in May 2015.

United States yearly total

May

May 3 event

May 4 event

May 5 event

May 6 event

May 7 event

May 8 event

May 9 event

May 10 event

May 11 event

May 13 event

May 14 event

May 15 event

May 16 event

May 17 event

May 18 event

May 19 event

May 20 event

May 21 event

May 22 event

May 23 event

May 24 event

May 25 event

May 26 event

May 27 event

May 28 event

May 29 event

May 30 event

May 31 event

See also
 Tornadoes of 2015
 List of United States tornadoes in April 2015
 List of United States tornadoes from June to August 2015

Notes

References

United States,05
2015,05
Tornadoes
Tornadoes,05